Sascha Nensel (born 9 May 1970) is a German former professional tennis player.

A right-handed player from Hanover, Nensel reached a career high ranking of ranking of 179 in the world. He won the Montabaur Challenger tournament in 1989 and qualified for the main draw of two ATP Tour events, the German Open and at Buzios, both in 1992.

Nensel is now a tennis coach and runs his own tennis academy in Peine. He is a former coach of Nicolas Kiefer, Julia Görges and Andrea Petkovic.

Challenger titles

Singles: (1)

References

External links
 
 

1970 births
Living people
German male tennis players
West German male tennis players
German tennis coaches
Sportspeople from Hanover
Tennis people from Lower Saxony